SNV Netherlands Development Organisation is a not-for-profit international development organisation, established in the Netherlands in 1965.

Driven by the Sustainable Development Goals, SNV makes a lasting difference in the lives of people living in poverty by helping them raise incomes and access basic services. The organisation currently works in around 24 countries in Africa, Asia, and Latin America.

History 
SNV was established as the Stichting Nederlandse Vrijwilligers ("Foundation of Netherlands Volunteers") in 1965, under the Dutch Ministry of Foreign Affairs.

Originally focused on posting young Dutch volunteers to the Global South, SNV stopped working with volunteers in 1988 in response to the changing needs of host organisations and countries. SNV has since evolved to become one of the largest Dutch development organisations.

In 1993 the organisation changed its name to SNV Netherlands Development Organisation and in 2002 formally separated from the Ministry of Foreign Affairs.

Activities 
SNV currently provides capacity development services to local organisations in three sectors: Agriculture, Energy, and Water, Sanitation & Hygiene (WASH).

SNV's services include advice, brokering and stakeholder engagement, advocacy, fund management, results-based financing and delegated management.

Organisation 
SNV's Global Support Unit is located in The Hague, the Netherlands, with country offices in Africa, Asia and Latin America.

SNV currently operates programmes in the following countries:

Bangladesh; Benin; Bhutan; Burkina Faso; Burundi Cambodia; Ethiopia; Ghana; Honduras; Indonesia; Kenya; Lao PDR; Mali; Mozambique; Nepal; Nicaragua; Niger; Peru; Rwanda; Tanzania; Uganda; Vietnam; Zambia; Zimbabwe.

The organisation employed more than 1,315 staff worldwide in 2021.

Awards 
SNV-supported programmes have won a number of international awards, including the International Energy Globe and Ashden awards for sustainable energy (2008, 2010).

Gallery

References

Further reading 
 SNV Strategic Plan 2019-2022 
 SNV Annual Report 2020
 Simon O'Connell named new SNV CEO

External links 

 
 SNV on LinkedIn
 SNV on Twitter
 SNV on Facebook
 SNV Youtube channel
 SNV Newsletter

Economic development organizations
1965 establishments in the Netherlands
 Organizations established in 1965